Brachyolene ochreosignata is a species of beetle in the family Cerambycidae. It was described by Stephan von Breuning in 1940. It is known from the Central African Republic and Gabon.

References

Tetraulaxini
Beetles described in 1940
Taxa named by Stephan von Breuning (entomologist)